is a Japanese voice actor from Tokyo Prefecture. He is affiliated with Mausu Promotion.

Filmography

Television animation
2004
Yakitate!! Japan (Gardener)

2005
Aria the Animation (Performer A)
Gallery Fake (Jury)
Tide-Line Blue (Sang-jun)
Black Cat (Durham Glaster)

2006
Air Gear (Senior Gunz Student)
Ouran High School Host Club (Sake Store Owner)
Glass Fleet (Bride's father, Commander)
Gintama (Yashichi)
Coyote Ragtime Show (Caster, Richard)
The Third: The Girl with the Blue Eye (Arms dealer, Council member, Council Member 1)
Jyu-Oh-Sei (Ochre Second)
009-1 (Soldier B)
Tactical Roar (Committee chairman)
Tokko (Principal)
Project Blue Earth SOS (Captain, Invincible Captain)
Yomigaeru Sora - RESCUE WINGS (125 Pilot, Koyama, Ogata, Tomioka)

2007
Yes! Precure 5 (Ushi)
Oh! Edo Rocket (Rokube)
Mobile Suit Gundam 00 (Captain, Head of State, Massoud Rachmadi, Ragna Harvey, Soldier)
Kekkaishi (Japanese Teacher)
Shakugan no Shana Second (Butler)
Devil May Cry (Akuma)]
Wangan Midnight (Jun Sonoda)

2008
Amatsuki (Bantou, Nakamuraya Head Clerk, Yorozu-ya Head Clerk)
Allison & Lillia (Besser, Captain)
Yes! Precure 5 GoGo! (Hoshiina)
Golgo 13 (Doctor)
Shigofumi: Letters from the Departed (Yakuza)
Junjou Romantica (Old Man)
Michiko to Hatchin (Shopkeeper)

2009
Kiddy Girl-and (Enemy A)
Gintama (Right Behind You Haha!!)

2010
Iron Man (Editor Nomura)
High School of the Dead (Head of Security Section)
Kuroshitsuji II (Earl Trancy)
Night Raid 1931 (Kyujiro Hayashi)
Fullmetal Alchemist: Brotherhood (Fox, Trader A)
Rainbow - Nisha Rokubō no Shichinin (Campaigner, Setsuko's Father)

2011
Un-Go (Kichitarou Mitaka)
Steins;Gate (Butler)
Naruto Shippuden (Kisuke Maboroshi)
Blood-C (Cop)
Pokémon: Black and White (Dr. Tsurara)

2012
Fate/Zero (Father Simon)

2013
Star Blazers 2199 (Vance Bahren)
Gaist Crusher (Gōka Shirogane)
Galilei Donna (Cassini)
Naruto: Shippuden (Osoi)

2014
Sakura Trick (Principal)
Re:Hamatora (Sawamura)

2016
Mob Psycho 100 (Kenji Mitsuura)
My Hero Academia (Sludge Villain)

2018
Garo: Vanishing Line (Doctor Stanley)

2019
Blade of the Immortal -Immortal- (Sōsuke Abayama)

Original net animation
JoJo's Bizarre Adventure: Stone Ocean (2021) (Judge)

Theatrical animation
Paprika (2006) (Magician)

Video games
Crash Boom Bang! (2006) (Crunch Bandicoot)
Elsword (????) (Denka)
Fire Emblem Heroes (2021) (Solon, Veld)
Izuna: Legend of the Unemployed Ninja (????) (Shūchi)
Routes (????) (Nagase Genjirō)
Zack & Wiki: Quest for Barbaros' Treasure (2007) (Goons)
The Witcher 3: Wild Hunt (2015) (Sigismund Dijkstra)
Sonic Rush Adventure (2007) (Captain Whisker)
JoJo's Bizarre Adventure: All Star Battle (2013) (Pesci)
JoJo's Bizarre Adventure: Eyes of Heaven (2015) (Pesci)
Sdorica - Mirage (2019) (Devious Lewis Marco)

Tokusatsu
Samurai Sentai Shinkenger (2009) (Ayakashi Urawadachi (ep. 22))
Shuriken Sentai Ninninger (2015) (Youkai Baku (ep. 21))

Drama CD
Loveless' (????) (Shop manager)

Dubbing roles

Live-actionBill & Ted Face the Music (Captain Jonathan Logan (Hal Landon Jr.))Captain America: The First Avenger (Jacques Dernier (Bruno Ricci))Captain Phillips (John Cronan (Chris Mulkey))Casablanca (2013 Star Channel edition) (Signor Ugarte (Peter Lorre))A Dark Truth (Francisco Francis (Forest Whitaker))The Day Shall Come (Andy Mudd (Denis O'Hare))The Descendants (Hugh (Beau Bridges))Dolittle (Arnall Stubbins (Ralph Ineson))Endless Love (Harry Elliot (Robert Patrick))ER (Yates (T'Shaun Barrett))Extant (Alan Sparks (Michael O'Neill))Fair Game (Bill (Noah Emmerich))Gentleman Jack (Jeremiah Rawson (Shaun Dooley))Gossip Girl (Bart Bass (Robert John Burke))Hawaii Five-0 (Captain Lou Grover (Chi McBride))Hitchcock (Whitfield Cook (Danny Huston))The Hunger Games: Catching Fire (Beetee (Jeffrey Wright))The Hunger Games: Mockingjay – Part 1 (Beetee (Jeffrey Wright))The Hunger Games: Mockingjay – Part 2 (Beetee (Jeffrey Wright))Just Go with It (Eddie Sims (Nick Swardson))Last Night in Soho (Lindsey (Terence Stamp))Lilacs (Steinway (Aleksey Kortnev))My Blind Date with Life (Kleinschmidt (Johann von Bulow))Parasite (2021 NTV edition) (Oh Geun-sae (Park Myung-hoon))Peacemaker (August Smith / White Dragon (Robert Patrick))Piranha 3DD (Chet (David Koechner))Roman Holiday (2022 NTV edition) (Giovanni (Claudio Ermelli))Safe House (David Blackwell (Jason Merrells))Solo: A Star Wars Story (Tobias Beckett (Woody Harrelson))Sully (Jeff Skiles (Aaron Eckhart))Taken (Bernie Harris (David Warshofsky))Transformers: Dark of the Moon (Voshkod (Ravil Isyanov))Venom (Jack (Mac Brandt))Warrior (Samuel Blake (Christian McKay))Whitney Houston: I Wanna Dance with Somebody (Clive Davis (Stanley Tucci))The Wolf on Wall Street (Max Belfort (Rob Reiner))

AnimationCode Lyoko (Jim Moralés)Fantastic Mr. Fox (Clive Badger)Hawaiian Vacation (Buttercup)Rango (Sergeant Turkey)Toy Story 3 (Buttercup)Toy Story 4'' (Buttercup)

References

External links
 
Mausu Promotion
 Shinya Fukumatsu at GamePlaza-Haruka Voice Acting Database 

Japanese male video game actors
Japanese male voice actors
Living people
1958 births
Male voice actors from Tokyo
20th-century Japanese male actors
21st-century Japanese male actors
Mausu Promotion voice actors